Richard Grönblom (born 17 July 1948) is a Finnish sailor. He competed at the 1976 Summer Olympics and the 1996 Summer Olympics.

References

External links
 

1948 births
Living people
Finnish male sailors (sport)
Olympic sailors of Finland
Sailors at the 1976 Summer Olympics – Finn
Sailors at the 1996 Summer Olympics – Star
Sportspeople from Helsinki